Osorius is a genus of unmargined rove beetles in the family Staphylinidae. There are about nine described species in Osorius.

Species
 Osorius brevicornis Notman, 1920
 Osorius brevipennis Notman, 1925
 Osorius difficilis Notman, 1925
 Osorius latipes (Gravenhorst, 1806)
 Osorius parcus Sharp, 1887
 Osorius parviceps Notman, 1925
 Osorius planifrons LeConte, 1877
 Osorius politus LeConte, 1877
 Osorius variolatus Notman, 1925

References

Further reading

 
 
 
 
 
 
 
 
 
 
 
 
 
 
 
 

Osoriinae